Timebelle is a Swiss-Romanian band from Bern, currently consisting of lead vocalist Miruna Mănescu, drummer Samuel Forster, and multi-instrumentalist Emanuel Daniel Andriescu. Past members include accordionist Rade Mijatović, guitarist Christoph Siegrist, and bassist Sándor Török. The band was formed as a five-member boyband while its members were students at the University of Bern. Shortly after, Mănescu was added to the group as a lead singer by their Romanian producer Mihai Alexandru. The name of the band is derived from the Zytglogge which is one of the main sights of Bern. While the band was formed in and is based in Switzerland, its members have hailed from Romania, Hungary, and Serbia, in addition to Switzerland.

The band represented Switzerland in the Eurovision Song Contest 2017 with the song "Apollo" placing 12th in the 2nd Semi Final. They previously attempted to represent Switzerland in the Eurovision Song Contest 2015 with the song "Singing About Love", but failed, placing second in the Swiss national final.

Members

Current
 Miruna Mănescu – lead vocals (from Romania)
 Samuel Forster – drums (from Switzerland) 
 Emanuel Daniel Andriescu – saxophone, clarinet, piano (from Romania)

Former
 Rade Mijatović – accordion (from Serbia)
 Christoph Siegrist – guitar (from Switzerland)
 Sándor Török – bass (from Hungary)

Discography

Extended plays

Singles

References

External links

Swiss musical groups
Eurovision Song Contest entrants for Switzerland
Eurovision Song Contest entrants of 2017